Through My Dog's Eyes is the fourth studio album by the Italian avant-garde metal band Ephel Duath. The album's concept was conceived by guitarist and founding member Davide Tiso, in which the whole album is from the viewpoint of a dog. The album's artwork is done by Seldon Hunt, who has done artwork for bands such as Sunn O))), Isis, Neurosis, and Earth.  The recording and mixing was handled by Novembre's drummer Giuseppe Orlando.

In the same announcement that proclaimed professional poker player Guillermo Gonzales as the vocalist after Luciano George Lorusso quit the band, they also announced that the song "Breed" was listenable on their Myspace.

Track listing
All music and lyrics by Ephel Duath
 "Gift" - 2:27
 "Promenade" - 3:33
 "Breed" - 3:28
 "Silent Door" - 2:48
 "Bella Morte" - 2:24
 "Nina" - 4:27
 "Guardian" - 3:20
 "Spider Shaped Leaves" - 4:56
 "Bark Loud" - 4:55

Personnel
Luciano George Lorusso - vocals
Davide Tiso - guitar, bass
Marco Minnemann - drums

Credits
Seldon Hunt - Artwork, layout
Giuseppe Orlando - Mixing, guitar and vocal recording
Marco Minnemann - Drum recording
Finnvox Studios - mastering
Riccardo Gamondi - Preproduction
Raffaele Buono (Rough) - Synthesizer on "Nina"
Francesco Fracassi (Fuzzy) - Synthesizer mixing on "Nina"
Lou Chano - Programming on "Nina"
Ben Weinman - Programming on "Bark Loud"

Recording
Preproduction of the album was done at Fiscer-Prais Studio in Alessandria, Italy.  The guitars and vocals were recorded and mixed at Outer Sound Studios in Rome beginning in July 2008.  The drums were recorded by Marco Minnemann at Homebase Seacoast Studio in California before the rest of the band had even entered the studio.

References

2009 albums
Concept albums
Ephel Duath (band) albums
Earache Records albums